Antonio Guidi (28 October 1927 – 17 October 2013) was an Italian actor and voice actor.

Biography
Born in Ferrara, Guidi began a career of acting in the 1950s. He originally wanted to become an architect but he did not pursue that vocation. He worked for two years at the Piccolo Teatro in Milan, then he became a stage actor. In addition, he also worked on radio and screen. He made his first ever film appearance in The Archangel starring Vittorio Gassman and on television, he made his debut on I legionari dello spazio.

Guidi was also a professional voice actor. He was the official Italian voice of Peter Ustinov as well as dubbing Peter Falk and Dominic Chianese in most of their work. He was internationally renowned for performing the Italian voice of Lieutenant Colombo (portrayed by Peter Falk) in the last two seasons of Columbo since the death of Giampiero Albertini in 1991. He also voiced Prince John in the Italian-Language version of the 1973 animated film Robin Hood.

After finishing his voice work on Colombo, Guidi retired in 2004, effectively ending his career.

Death
Guidi died in Bergamo on 17 October 2013, just 11 days before his 86th birthday.

Filmography

Cinema
The Archangel (1969)
The Killer Is on the Phone (1972)
At Last, at Last (1975)
Young, Violent, Dangerous (1976)
Hanno ucciso un altro bandito (1976)
Ombre (1980)

Television
I legionari dello spazio (1966)
Delitto di regime - Il caso Don Minzoni (1973)
La commediante veneziana (1979)

Dubbing roles

Animation
Prince John in Robin Hood

Live action
Lieutenant Colombo in Columbo (seasons 9-11)
Fred G. Sanford in Sanford and Son
Fred G. Sanford in Sanford
Hercule Poirot in Evil Under the Sun
Hercule Poirot in Death on the Nile
The Old Man in Logan's Run
Herod the Great / Pontius Pilate in Jesus of Nazareth
Rowlie in Lassie Come Home (1975 redub)
President in Being There
Gloves Malloy / Spats Baxter in Movie Movie
Alonzo A. Hawk in Herbie Rides Again
Ed Hocken in The Naked Gun: From the Files of Police Squad!
Roy Bensinger in The Front Page
Chiz in Countdown

Video games
Alexandre Valembois in Amerzone

References

External links

1927 births
2013 deaths
Actors from Ferrara
Italian male film actors
Italian male stage actors
Italian male television actors
Italian male voice actors
Italian male radio actors
Italian male video game actors
20th-century Italian male actors